Monika Walentyna Falej (born 8 February 1972) is a Polish politician. She was elected to the Sejm (9th term) representing the constituency of Elbląg from The Left's lists.

Private life
Falej is disabled and has been working in behalf of improving the disabled's life conditions in her local community.

References 

Living people
1972 births
Place of birth missing (living people)
21st-century Polish politicians
21st-century Polish women politicians
Members of the Polish Sejm 2019–2023
Women members of the Sejm of the Republic of Poland